Abbasabad (also Romanized as ‘Abbāsābād) is a village in Mirbag-e Jonubi Rural District, in the Central District of Delfan County, Lorestan Province, Iran. At the 2006 census, its population was 30, in 6 families.

References 

Towns and villages in Delfan County